Yorktown is a city in DeWitt County, Texas, United States. The population was 1,810 at the 2020 census.

Geography

Yorktown is located in southwestern DeWitt County at  (28.983196, –97.502415). State Highways 72 and 119 intersect on the western side of town. Highway 72 leads northeast  to Cuero and southwest  to Kenedy, while Highway 119 leads northwest  to Stockdale and south  to Goliad.

Climate

The climate in this area is characterized by hot, humid summers and generally mild to cool winters. According to the Köppen Climate Classification system, Yorktown has a humid subtropical climate, abbreviated "Cfa" on climate maps.

Demographics

As of the 2020 United States census, there were 1,810 people, 901 households, and 562 families residing in the city.

As of the census of 2000, there were 2,271 people, 864 households, and 584 families residing in the city. The population density was 1,318.1 people per square mile (509.8/km). There were 1,048 housing units at an average density of 608.3 per square mile (235.3/km). The racial makeup of the city was 79.83% White, 2.99% African American, 0.40% Native American, 15.32% from other races, and 1.45% from two or more races. Hispanic or Latino of any race were 37.60% of the population.

There were 864 households, out of which 30.7% had children under the age of 18 living with them, 50.7% were married couples living together, 12.5% had a female householder with no husband present, and 32.3% were non-families. 29.9% of all households were made up of individuals, and 18.9% had someone living alone who was 65 years of age or older. The average household size was 2.54 and the average family size was 3.15.

In the city, the population was spread out, with 26.3% under the age of 18, 7.8% from 18 to 24, 22.7% from 25 to 44, 20.7% from 45 to 64, and 22.5% who were 65 years of age or older. The median age was 40 years. For every 100 females, there were 85.7 males. For every 100 females age 18 and over, there were 81.6 males.

The median income for a household in the city was $25,507, and the median income for a family was $28,529. Males had a median income of $25,234 versus $17,031 for females. The per capita income for the city was $12,041. About 18.4% of families and 23.1% of the population were below the poverty line, including 31.5% of those under age 18 and 16.2% of those age 65 or over.

History

The city was founded by Captain John York and Charles Eckhardt and named in honor of Captain John York, a famous Indian fighter and was in command of a company of citizens who, under Ben Milam, defeated General Cos in 1835 at the Siege of Béxar. For his military services, York received many acres of land in the Coleto Creek area.

Charles Eckhardt started a mercantile business in Indianola which at that time was a major Texas seaport. Eckhardt participated in the Texas Revolution and may have met Captain York during military service. Eckhardt contracted with John A. King, one of the pioneers of West Texas, to survey a road from Indianola through Yorktown to New Braunfels, later known as the Old Indianola Trail. From its inception in February, 1848, this road remained the chief thoroughfare for this part of the state to New Braunfels and San Antonio. This trail shortened the former route by twenty miles and established Yorktown as an important relay station for freighters, prairie schooners, trail drivers, and stagecoaches bringing mail and passengers. They came through upper town on North Riedel Street.

Early in 1848, after the founders had the proposed town surveyed, they offered  and the choice of a lot free to the first ten families to settle the townsite. Many German, Bohemian, Lithuanian and Polish families came and soon changed this wilderness into one of the most prosperous sections of the entire state.

In May, 1848, Peter Metz and John Frank built the first house in the settlement of Yorktown for Charles Eckhardt. It was built of logs, twelve by twenty feet, with a back room and chimney. This house was later occupied by a brother, Caesar Eckhardt, who was the founder of C. Eckhardt and Sons Mercantile Company, known for half a century as the leading firm of its kind in western DeWitt County.

Unfortunately, neither of the founders lived to see the town develop beyond this point. In October 1848, in a battle with Marauding Indians, Captain York and his son-in-law, James Madison Bell, were killed. They were buried in a single hand-made coffin in the Yorktown Cemetery some seven miles (11 km) east of Yorktown; a historical marker designates York's grave.  In 1852, on an inspection of some of his properties in Central America, Eckhardt contracted yellow fever and died at sea on his return trip. He is buried in New Orleans. The Eckhardts did not have any children while the Yorks had ten children.

The Catholics established a church in 1867 and the Lutherans in 1872. The huge oak tree on the lawn of the latter church is one of the oldest in the state. The town was incorporated in 1871.

Western Days

Celebrated on the third weekend of October, Western Days is a three-day town celebration featuring a carnival, barbecue cook-off, horseshoes and washers tournaments, quilt show, poker run, and street dancing. Western Days is held downtown at the city park. Numerous food booths and art and craft stands line the streets. Saturday morning begins with a large parade through town. Western days is one of the few festivals in the area that charges no admission to the park or dance.

Officially started in 1958, Western Days has its roots dating from the early to mid 1950s with Leslie and Cecil Mueller's M&M Rodeo Company organizing cowboy parades to promote the rodeo performances on Smith Creek, just south of Yorktown. A showman and promoter, Leslie Mueller gathered the rodeo cowboys to ride horseback through downtown Yorktown. These processions were said to have been quite a wild sight. Since there were not enough broke saddle horses to go around, many of the cowboys paraded down Main on broncs right out of the bucking horse string.

In the spring of 1958 Mueller, in cooperation with the Yorktown Chamber of Commerce, planned a Western parade to involve the entire community, as well as out-of-town organizations. A two-day rodeo was planned as well. Mueller pledged a pair of handmade boots to the parade's best-dressed cowgirl, while the Chamber promised boots to the best-dressed cowboy. Other prizes were pledged from community businesses such as Daniel Dry Gods, Simecek's Firestone, J. E. Wolf Sr. and Cole Dry goods.

The April 2, 1958, edition of The Yorktown News reported that the parade was "conceived on the spur of the moment, with no time make elaborate plans, appoint committees or work out details…."  The newspaper further reported that the success of the venture was due "…to the spontaneous and whole-hearted cooperation of local business men…" In spite of this last-minute planning, on Saturday, March 29 at 3 p.m. Yorktown welcomed a crowd that jammed the downtown sidewalks to see the parade led by the VFW Color Guard. The "Bronc Busters" (the Yorktown High School marching band), led by Mary Gail Kerlick, followed close behind. The parade featured the famous Lone Star Brewing Company Shetland Pony Hitch. This team of matched Shetlands was outfitted with ten gallon hats and six shooters and pulled a miniature covered wagon. A parade highlight was Monroe Woods' mustang team pulling a frontier wagon carrying an ancient two-seater Chick Sale (outhouse), complete with corn cobs and a Sears catalog. The parade also included colorfully-garbed mounted groups, several floats, new tractors, trucks and automobiles, as well as the four-piece Disintegrated Brotherhood of Near Musicians. With a broom and shovel, Sparky, the rodeo clown, brought up the rear and proclaimed that Yorktown was not a one-horse town indeed.

The Yorktown News also reported that most of the western parade watchers "…hightailed it out to Les Mueller's Smith Creek Arena…to take in the rodeo....We saw cars bumper to bumper all the way over the hill and as they wended their way into the grounds more and more kept coming....The show got underway about nine o'clock, and a thriller it was…with mean, ornery broncs and bulls, and fast elusive calves, there were plenty of spills, thrills and chills…as good a show as we've seen anywhere." Rodeo events included calf roping, bareback bronc riding, bull riding, bull dogging, saddle bronc riding and the ladies' barrel race. The performance also featured Tab Evans and his trained hog, Pork Chop and his trained dog, Wheeler.

After the success of the first parade and rodeo, the Yorktown Chamber of Commerce continued the celebration annually. In 1962 the Chamber sponsored the first Western Days royal court with Jo Ann Boone crowned as queen. For nearly two decades, M&M Rodeo Company produced a rodeo in conjunction with the Western Days celebration. Throughout the years, the rodeos featured celebrated cowboys such as Bud Humphrey, Glen Dorn, Pat Doyle, Glenn McQueen, Billy Bridges, Cotton Proctor, Sonny Berry and Phil Lyne. Working ranch cowboys from the area who rode as pick-up men included Carl Hoefling, John Horny and Lester Davis. Raymond Stoebner of Victoria served as rodeo announcer while renowned rodeo bull fighters Darrel "Sparky" Sparkman and Billy Willis entertained the crowd with clown antics while protecting the bull riders. Willis died in Waco at age 68.

In 1962 Mueller constructed a new arena on his ranch north of Yorktown on Highway 240 in the small community once known as Little St. Louis and the rodeos were moved from the Smith Creek arena.

In July 1963 Mueller died after a horseback riding accident during a rodeo in Cuero. However, the Western Days rodeos continued with Mueller's widow, Cecil Olivia Gilliam Mueller and son Don, managing M&M Rodeo Company. The last rodeo they produced in Yorktown was in 1975.

Today, Western Days continues to draw parade participants from surrounding counties, as well as visitors from across the country. The thousands who come to Yorktown each year enjoy not only the Grand Parade, but live music and entertainment, chili cook-offs, various contests, shopping and the genuine fellowship of the townspeople—the spirit out of which the celebration was born 55 years ago.

Photo Gallery

Notable people

Harlon Block, one of the soldiers pictured in Raising the Flag on Iwo Jima
Ox Eckhardt, Major League Baseball player

References

External links
Community website
Yorktown Independent School District
"Scenes of Yorktown, TX" Footage of daily life in Yorktown in 1940. From the Ray Jelinek Collection, Texas Archive of the Moving Image.

Cities in DeWitt County, Texas
Cities in Texas